The 12937 / 12938 Garba Express is a Express train belonging to Western Railway zone that runs between  and  in India. It is currently being operated with 12937/12938 train numbers on a weekly basis.

Coaches

The train has standard LHB rakes with max speed of 110 kmph. The train consists of 22 coaches:

 1 AC II Tier
 5 AC III Tier
 8 Sleeper coaches
 6 General Unreserved
 2 EOG cum Luggage Rake

As with most train services in India, coach composition may be amended at the discretion of Indian Railways depending on demand.

Service

12937/Gandhidham–Howrah Garbha Express has an average speed of 58 km/hr and covers 2525 km in 43 hrs 30 mins.
12938/Howrah–Gandhidham Garbha Express has an average speed of 61 km/hr and covers 2525 km in 41 hrs 30 mins.

Route & Halts

The important halts of the train are:

Schedule

Direction reversal

Train reverses its direction at;

 .

Rake sharing

The train shares its rake with 22951/22952 Bandra Terminus–Gandhidham Weekly Superfast Express.

Traction

A Vatva Loco Shed based WDM-3A diesel locomotive hauls the train from Gandhidham Junction to Ahmedabad Junction, after which a Vadodara Loco Shed based WAP-7 electric locomotive hauls the train for the remainder of its journey until Howrah.

References

Transport in Gandhidham
Rail transport in Howrah
Railway services introduced in 2010
Express trains in India
Named passenger trains of India
Rail transport in Gujarat
Rail transport in West Bengal
Rail transport in Uttar Pradesh
Rail transport in Madhya Pradesh
Rail transport in Bihar
Rail transport in Rajasthan
Rail transport in Jharkhand